Alu is a system of volcanic fissures, located in Ethiopia. The fissures have produced silicic lava flows, and other fissures south of the volcano have been the source of huge youthful basaltic lava flows, which enlarge to the north as far as Lake Bakili. There is major fumarolic activity, located on parallel faults, some with 100-m uplifts.

Alu, Erta Ale, Tat Ali and other Ethiopian Highlands are together known as the Danakil Alps.

References 

Volcanoes of Ethiopia
Fissure vents
Ethiopian Highlands